Strunkovice nad Blanicí is a market town in Prachatice District in the South Bohemian Region of the Czech Republic. It has about 1,300 inhabitants.

Administrative parts
Villages of Blanička, Malý Bor, Protivec, Šipoun, Svojnice, Velký Bor and Žíchovec are administrative parts of Strunkovice nad Blanicí.

Twin towns – sister cities

Strunkovice nad Blanicí is twinned with:
 Stocken-Höfen, Switzerland

References

Populated places in Prachatice District
Market towns in the Czech Republic
Prácheňsko